Gill Township may refer to the following townships in the United States:

 Gill Township, Sullivan County, Indiana
 Gill Township, Clay County, Kansas